Mont Soleil is a mountain of the Jura Mountains, located north of Saint-Imier in the canton of Bern, Switzerland.

Gallery

See also
List of mountains of Switzerland accessible by public transport

References

External links

Mont Soleil on Hikr
Funiculaire Saint-Imier-Mont-Soleil

Mountains of the Jura
Mountains of the canton of Bern
Mountains of Switzerland
One-thousanders of Switzerland